Magnetic Maharashtra is a summit held in Maharashtra, India, aimed to attract investment into the economy of Maharashtra.

Under Chief Minister Uddhav Thackeray, "Magnetic Maharashtra 2.0 was launched in 2020.

2018
The 2018 edition of the summit, called Magnetic Maharashtra: Convergence 2018, was organised from 18 to 20 February 2018, at MMRDA Ground, Bandra-Kurla Complex, Mumbai, India. The event was inaugurated by the ten Chief Minister of Maharashtra, Devendra Fadnavis and was attended by Prime Minister Narendra Modi and NITI Aayog CEO Amitabh Kant.

2020
The second edition of the summit. called Magnetic Maharashtra 2.0  was launched in June, 2020, amid the COVID-19 pandemic in Maharashtra. The event was inaugurated by Chief Minister of Maharashtra Uddhav Thackeray. 56 MOUs with investments worth  were signed.

References

Economy of Maharashtra
February 2018 events in India
Business conferences in India